Montréal–Saint-Laurent was a provincial electoral district in the Montreal region of the province of Quebec, Canada.

It was created for the 1912 election from parts of Montréal division no. 4 and Montréal division no. 6 electoral districts. Its final election was in 1936.  It disappeared in the 1939 election and its successor electoral districts were Montreal–Sainte-Anne and Montreal–Saint-Jacques.

Members of the Legislative Assembly
 John Thomas Finnie, Liberal (1912–1918)
 Henry Miles, Liberal (1918–1923)
 Ernest Walter Sayer, Conservative (1923–1927)
 Joseph Cohen, Liberal (1927–1936)
 Thomas Joseph Coonan, Union Nationale (1936–1939)

References
 Election results (National Assembly)
 Election results (QuebecPolitique.com)

Former provincial electoral districts of Quebec